Muhammad Latif (born 13 February 1939) is a Pakistani wrestler. He competed in the men's freestyle welterweight at the 1956 Summer Olympics.

References

External links
 

1939 births
Living people
Pakistani male sport wrestlers
Olympic wrestlers of Pakistan
Wrestlers at the 1956 Summer Olympics
Place of birth missing (living people)